Bartkevičius is a Lithuanian-language surname. Polish counterpart: Bartkiewicz, Russian/Belarusian: Bartkevich. The surname is derived from Bartek, a diminutive for Bartholomeus.

Ričardas Bartkevičius,  Lithuanian painter and educator
Antanas Bartkevičius, Lithuanian astronomer, namesake of asteroid 141496 Bartkevicius
Juozas Bartkevičius, a Lithuanian Righteous Among the Nations

Lithuanian-language surnames